Dry Creek Glacier is located in Shoshone National Forest, in the U.S. state of Wyoming on Dry Creek Ridge, a high altitude plateau to the east of the main summits of the Wind River Range.

See also
 List of glaciers in the United States

References

Glaciers of Fremont County, Wyoming
Glaciers of Wyoming